Map of places in Newport compiled from this list
 See the list of places in Wales for places in other principal areas.

This is a categorised list of places in the City of Newport, South Wales.

Electoral Wards
See :List of electoral wards in Newport, Wales

This is a list of electoral wards:

Notable places

Archaeological sites
Caerleon
Caldicot and Wentloog Levels including -
Goldcliff
Uskmouth

Conservation areas
Uskmouth

Historical buildings
Tredegar House
Newport Civic Centre
Newport Castle
Newport Cathedral
Westgate Hotel

Municipal parks
Tredegar Park
Beechwood Park
Belle Vue Park

Shopping centres
Kingsway Shopping Centre
Cambrian Centre (City Spires)
Friars Walk
Newport Retail Park

Cultural venues

Sport
Celtic Manor Resort 
Kingsway Arena
Newport Stadium (capacity: 4,300)
Rodney Parade (capacity: 11,700)
Hayley Stadium (speedway)
Newport International Sports Village

Performing arts
Performing arts venues with seating capacity:
Dolman Theatre (400)
Newport Centre (2,000)
The NEON (1,546)
Riverfront Arts Centre (500 in main theatre)

Typically standing venues:
T.J.'s

Geographical

Rivers and waterways
Fourteen Locks
Monmouthshire Canal
River Usk
Ebbw River
Afon Llwyd

Streets and squares
 John Frost Square

Education places
University of Wales, Newport
Coleg Gwent City of Newport campus

Transport

Bus and railway stations
Newport bus station
Newport railway station
Rogerstone railway station

Major roads
A48 road
A449 road
A4042 road
M4 motorway
A48(M) motorway
New M4 (not yet built)
Commercial Street
High Street

Railway lines
Ebbw Valley Railway
Gloucester to Newport Line
South Wales Main Line (Great Western Main Line)
Welsh Marches Line

Cycling
National Cycle Network: routes 4, 46 and 47

Shipping
Newport Docks

Bridges and crossings
River Usk, north to south:
Caerleon Bridge
St. Julian's railway bridge
M4 motorway Usk bridge
Usk Railway Bridge
Newport Bridge
Newport City footbridge
George Street Bridge
City Bridge
Newport Transporter Bridge

places
Newport